Thomas H. Owen (1873–1938) was a judge of the Oklahoma Supreme Court. He born in Arkansas, where he grew to manhood, and came to Indian Territory in 1894. According to Victor Harlow's version of Owen's biography, Owen was born near Jasper, Arkansas on February 24, 1873.

An article in Chronicles of Oklahoma wrote that Thomas Horner Owen studied law with W. M. Crump (later a judge in Muskogee, but then located in Harrison, Arkansas).

Career in Oklahoma 
After becoming a member of the bar, Owen began practicing in the small communities of Vian and Muldrow, before moving to Muskogee, Oklahoma in 1896. In 1901, he joined the law firm of Soper & Huckleberry in Muskogee and after statehood, served as political manager for Charles Haskell, who was seeking election as the first governor of the state. Plunging into local politics, he became Muskogee's City Attorney in 1901-02. In 1910-11, he was named Judge of the Court of Criminal Appeals and Muskogee County Attorney in 1911-12. After that term expired, he returned to private practice in 1912-1917. In 1912, Owen was a delegate to the Democratic National Convention in Baltimore, supporting Woodrow Wilson as the party's presidential candidate. He also served as Assistant Secretary for the Democratic National Committee (DNC) in the party headquarters. Then he returned to his private law practice.

Owen was appointed Associate Justice on the Oklahoma Supreme Court by Governor Robert L. Williams, serving from 1917-1919. In 1920-21, he served as Chief Justice, then resigned.

When Oklahoma City Mayor Jack Walton announced that he would run for the Democratic nomination in 1922, Conservative Democrats opposed to him announced their support for Judge Thomas H. Owen. Robert H. Wilson, state superintendent of education and allegedly supported by the Ku Klux Klan also campaigned for the Democratic nomination. The split in the Democratic ranks gave an edge to Walton for the nomination. The Conservative Democrats then supported the Republican candidate John H. Fields, who lost to Walton in the general election.

Running for governor was his final run for office. He then became trustee of the American National Bank until 1926, then resumed private law practice.

Personal  
Owen married his first wife, Beulah Davis, in Muskogee on September 14, 1898.  

He died from a blood infection in Oklahoma City on September 19, 1938.

Notes

References 

1872 births
1938 deaths
People from Newton County, Arkansas
People from Muskogee, Oklahoma
Justices of the Oklahoma Supreme Court
 People from Oklahoma City